Dressing commonly refers to:
 Dressing (knot), the process of arranging a knot
 Dressing (medical), a medical covering for a wound, usually made of cloth
 Dressing, putting on clothing

Dressing may also refer to:

Food
 Salad dressing, a type of sauce which is generally poured on a salad, or spread on the bread of a sandwich
 Stuffing, also called dressing, a mixture of various ingredients used to fill a cavity in another food item

Other uses
 Dressing, the application of a profile onto a grinding wheel
 Dressing, a covering or enhanced construction method to improve an object's appearance:
 Ashlar, stone dressing(s)
 Brickwork dressings, using counter-coloured or complementary coloured bricks
 Stucco (also known as render or rendering): 
Binder (material) and water applied in decorative fashion; it can also refer to interior 
aggregates, 
Plasterwork in relief
 Well dressing (decoration), a tradition practised in some parts of rural England
 Dressing, the preparation of a game animal for consumption or sale—see butcher
 Dressed weight, refers to the weight of an animal after being partially butchered
 Dressed particle, a bare particle together with some excitations of other quantum fields
 Ore dressing, mineral processing
 Ship dressing or dressing overall, stringing international maritime signal flags on a ship at special occasions
 "The Dressing", an episode of the Adult Swim animated television series, Aqua Teen Hunger Force

See also
 
 
 Covering (disambiguation)
 Dress (disambiguation)
 Dressing down
 Dressing Up (disambiguation)